A. Bennett "Benny" MacDonell (1930 – September 2, 1969) was a Canadian football player who played for the Ottawa Rough Riders. He won the Grey Cup with them in 1951. MacDonnell was born in Ottawa, the son of Duncan MacDonnell, Ottawa Chief of Police. He was the father of former Ottawa news anchor Gary MacDonnell. He was later an Ontario Provincial Police officer after his retirement from sports. MacDonnell died in 1969 after accidentally shooting himself while cleaning his service revolver when the weapon discharged, striking him in the head.

References

1930 births
1969 deaths
Canadian football people from Ottawa
Players of Canadian football from Ontario
Ottawa Rough Riders players